The 23 April 2009 Iraqi suicide attacks were two separate suicide attacks which occurred in Baghdad and Muqdadiyah, Iraq, on 23 April 2009. At least seventy-six people are known to have died in the attacks, including several Iranian pilgrims. The Los Angeles Times puts the death toll at seventy-nine. Most of the forty-eight people killed in Muqdadiyah, near Baqubah, Diyala Province, are believed to have been Iranian nationals. According to the BBC, if the death tolls are confirmed, these attacks were the most lethal of 2009.

Attacks

Baghdad 
At least eighty people are known to have died in Baghdad when an explosive belt was detonated by a female. Police were said to have been assisting and administering aid to homeless people in the Basil square in the Alwehda district. Over fifty people were wounded in the attack. A minimum of six National Police officers were killed, with one police officer describing how he carried off three bodies belonging to his colleagues whose uniforms were "drenched in blood". Five children and two Red Crescent volunteers were counted amongst the dead. Thirty-five-year-old Issam Salim, a survivor injured by shrapnel as he waited for a bus, said: "I turned around as I fell to the ground and saw a big fire break out with black smoke. Women and children are crying from pain beside me in the hospital. Some of them suffered burns." The scene in the aftermath of the attack was said to have been marked by chaos.

Muqdadiyah 
At least forty-eight people, all but two of whom were Iranian pilgrims, were killed and approximately sixty-three others were injured when the New Khanaqin restaurant in Muqdadiyah was targeted at 12:45 pm The Iranians had paused for lunch as they embarked on a pilgrimage to a Shi'a Muslim religious site in Baghdad. Sixty-four-year-old pilgrim, Kadhumi Sadiq, said: "While the waiter was serving us food a powerful explosion took place and the restaurant turned black. I suffered burns on my head, chest and hands". The restaurant was left demolished in the aftermath of the attack.

Abdulnasir al-Muntasirbillah, the recently sworn-in mayor of the region, visited the local hospital, describing the scene as "catastrophic" and the attack as dirty and cowardly.

Perpetrators 

Baghdad's security spokesman, Maj-Gen Qassim Moussawi, said: "It is a suicide bomber. Obviously that has the fingerprints of al-Qaeda”. 
Also other Iraqi officials, and the Los Angeles Times suggested, without citing sources, the involvement of al-Qaeda in Iraq.

Reaction 
The Washington Post called 23 April "the bloodiest day in Iraq this year". Reuters said it "appeared to be Iraq's bloodiest day in over a year" and surpassed an 11 December 2008 attack in Kirkuk which killed fifty.

These attacks were followed a day later by two more suicide attacks which killed sixty people at the al-Kādhimiya Mosque in Baghdad.

References 

2009 murders in Iraq
21st-century mass murder in Iraq
Mass murder in 2009
Al-Qaeda activities in Iraq
Suicide bombings in Iraq
Iraqi suicide attacks, 23 April
2000s in Baghdad
Terrorist incidents in Baghdad
April 2009 events in Iraq